Sam Grossman was an American film director and writer, mainly known for The Van, and for directing various music documentaries in the 1980s. Additionally, he wrote several stage plays and worked "extensively" in television. He died of cancer at his home in West Los Angeles on February 22, 1999.

References

External links
Variety: Article about Grossman's life (1999)

American film directors
English-language film directors
1945 births
1999 deaths
Deaths from cancer in California
AFI Conservatory alumni